Kosmos 35 ( meaning Cosmos 35) or Zenit-2 No.21 was a Soviet, first generation, low resolution, optical film-return reconnaissance satellite launched in 1964.

Kosmos 35 was launched by a Vostok-2 rocket, serial number R15001-03, flying from Site 31/6 at the Baikonur Cosmodrome. The launch took place at 11:31 GMT on 15 July 1964, and following its successful arrival in orbit the spacecraft received its Kosmos designation; along with the International Designator 1964-039A and the Satellite Catalog Number 00833.

On 23 July 1964, after eight days in orbit, the satellite was deorbited with its return capsule descending by parachute for recovery by Soviet forces.

References

Kosmos satellites
Spacecraft launched in 1964
Spacecraft which reentered in 1964
Zenit-2 satellites